Princess Mariam de Bagration (born 27 June 1947 in Madrid) is a Spanish-Georgian noblewoman (tavadi) of the House of Mukhrani.

Princess Mariam was born on 27 June 1947 in Madrid. She is a dentist.

She is a daughter of Prince Irakli Bagration of Mukhrani and Infanta María de las Mercedes de Baviera y Borbón.

In 1968 she married Spanish Ambassador José Luis Blanco-Briones y de Cuéllar (1935-1985). She has one daughter from this marriage:
Mercedes Tamara Blanco-Briones y Bagration (born 1969).

In 1982 she married Dr. Tomás Ortiz y Valero and has a son from this marriage:
Luis Alfonso Ortiz y Bagration (born 1983).

She is a sister of Bagrat de Bagration and half-sister of Jorge de Bagration.

Ancestors

References

1947 births
Living people
House of Mukhrani
Spanish people of Georgian descent
Nobility from Madrid